The sport of football in the country of Solomon Islands is run by the Solomon Islands Football Federation. The association administers the national football team, as well as the National Club Championship.

Solomon Islands football stadiums

References